Huancayo (in  , '(place) with a (sacred) rock') is the capital of Junín Region, in the central highlands of Peru.

Geography 

Huancayo is located in Huancayo Province, of which it is also the capital. Situated in the Mantaro Valley at an altitude of 3,271 meters, it belongs to the Quechua region. Depending on delimitation, the agglomeration has a population between 340,000 and 380,000 and is the fifth most populous city of the country. Huancayo is the cultural and commercial center of the whole central Peruvian Andes area. Huancayo Metropolitano is made up of seven districts that form the urban center of the Junín region. This region is considered central Peru's economic and social hub.

History

Pre-Columbian era 
The area was originally inhabited by the Huancas. At around 500 BC, they were incorporated into the Wari Empire. Despite efforts to defend its independence, the Huancas were eventually subdued by the Inca leader Pachacutec in 1460 and the region was incorporated into the Inca empire. It subsequently became a notable stopping point along the Inca Camino Real.

Colonial era 
After the Spanish colonization in 1534, Huancayo was overshadowed by Jauja, a provisional capital of Peru, until Lima took over that role, as established by the conquistador Francisco Pizarro.
In 1570, the viceroy Francisco de Toledo established the site as the center of his encomienda Guancayo. The town was officially established on 1 June 1572 with the title of Santísima Trinidad de Huancayo. In 1813, Huancayo celebrated the promulgation of the Constitution of Cadiz, changing the name of "Plaza del Comercio" to "Plaza de la Constitución".

Republican era
During the war for independence, Huancayo was liberated on 20 November 1820. Construction on the cathedral commenced in 1831. The accord was made law in Huancayo in 1854, when Peru officially ended slavery.  There is a statue in the Plaza Constitución commemorating this.

Recent situation
Today, in addition to its importance as a center of commerce, Huancayo is known for the crafts and the many festivals of the surrounding towns. Having rapidly expanded in recent decades, it has few remaining colonial buildings. Currently, the cityscape is dominated by modern construction.

The city's rise began with the construction of a central railway Callao-La Oroya in 1908 and later extended from Lima to Huancayo in the early 1930s. The railway connection between Lima and Huancayo, introduced new ways of transporting goods. The railway's new avenues for transport contributed to the city's economic and population growth. Population growth was mostly present in Tambo and Chilica, two suburban districts near the highways. Furthermore, population growth between 1981 and 2007 was a result of in-migration due to terrorist attacks of Sendero Luminoso. People from highlands and amazonian lowlands sought refugee in Andean cities such as Huancayo.

Demographics

According to the National Census of 2007, the three main districts of Huancayo have a total population of about 340,000. However, the continuous settlement area have already reached periurban districts, resulting in the agglomeration's population to be at least 380,000 people. Amerindian and Mestizos (Amerindian and Spanish ancestry) are the two largest ethnic groups in the city. Asian (mainly descendants of Japanese and Chinese immigrants) and European descendants are important minority groups.

Transport 

Huancayo has transportation connections by road and rail. The Francisco Carle Airport at Jauja offers daily connections to Lima and is located 45 minutes via car from Huancayo. Current airlines include LATAM Peru, LC Peru, and Peruvian Airlines. To travel by road, the Carretera Central links Huancayo with La Oroya and Lima, which generally takes 7 to 8 hours. Multiple bus carriers operate between Lima and Huancayo daily.  The Ferrocarril Central Andino enables transport by rail. Huancayo was a break-of-gauge from  gauge to  gauge for the  extension to Huancavelica.  In 2009, this line was being standardised. There was a plan Metro Wanka to use the railway line as a local metro however this never came to fruition.

Education

Local universities

 Universidad Nacional del Centro del Peru (UNCP)
 Universidad Peruana Los Andes (UPLA)
 Universidad Continental (UC)
 Universidad Franklin Roosevelt (UFR)

Branches of other Peruvian universities

 Universidad Alas Peruanas (UAP)
 Universidad Los Angeles de Chimbote (ULADECH)
 Universidad Nacional Mayor de San Marcos (UNMSM)
 Universidad Nacional Daniel Alcides Carrión (UNDAC)
 Universidad de Huanuco (UDH)

Language institutes

 Instituto Cultural Peruano Británico
 Instituto Cultural Peruano Norteamericano - Región Centro (ICPNA)
Alianza Francesa de Huancayo (French Alliance, AF)

Notable people

 Damaris Mallma Porras (1986- ), Peruvian folk singer
 Josué Sánchez (1945- ), painter
 Rodolfo Cerrón Palomino (1940- ), linguist
 Víctor Alberto Gil Mallma (1930–1975), musician
 Juan Parra del Riego (1894–1925), poet
 Enrique Bernardo (1980–), tenor and pianist

See also

 Wanka (disambiguation)
 Plaza El Coliseo, bullfighting stadium
 Papa a la Huancaína (literally, Huancayo style potatoes), a Peruvian dish

References

External links

  Official Portal Huancayo
  Official Municipal website

 
Populated places in the Junín Region
Cities in Peru
1572 establishments in the Spanish Empire
Regional capital cities in Peru